Rhyzodiastes guineensis is a species of ground beetle in the subfamily Rhysodinae. It was described by Antoine Henri Grouvelle in 1903. It is found in New Guinea, with records from both Papua New Guinea (Fly River, Purari River) and Western New Guinea (Yos Sudarso Bay).

References

Rhyzodiastes
Endemic fauna of New Guinea
Beetles of Indonesia
Beetles of Papua New Guinea
Beetles described in 1903